Not Quite the Diplomat: Home Truths About World Affairs is a book by Chris Patten, published by Allen Lane in September 2005. Patten was the last Governor of Hong Kong and afterwards became Europe's Commissioner for External Relations. In the book, he attempts to provide insights into the world of diplomacy and discusses the position of a unified Europe in relation to the United States and emerging powers such as India and China.

A revised version of the book for the American market is called Cousins and Strangers: America, Britain, and Europe in a New Century. It contains an additional chapter, Happy Families.

The book contains an interesting comment on Black and Scholes regarding their option pricing formula (p. 218): "... it is surely laughable when the highest awards are showered on those who promote the most gimcrack schemes to make them-selves rich, at least for a while. The geniuses who invented the pyramid of derivatives at Long-Term Capital Management were awarded the Nobel Prize for their cleverness, not long before the whole  edifice came crashing down with the financial community digging deep into its pockets to prevent too much collateral damage. To every excess, there comes a reaction."

References 

 
 
 Book Review: Gerhard Schroeder: Europe and the USA, Vierteljahreshefte für Politik und Kultur, Mai 2006 48 Jg., p. 72,73

2005 non-fiction books
Politics of Hong Kong
Non-fiction books about diplomacy
Books about foreign relations of the United Kingdom
Allen Lane (imprint) books